The Turkish Mauser can be used to describe many Mauser rifles used by the Ottoman Empire and then the Republic of Turkey.
 The Mauser Model 1887 rifle, chambered in 9.5x60mm
 The Mauser Model 1890 rifle and carbine, chambered in 7.65×53mm Mauser
 The Mauser Model 1893 rifle, chambered in 7.65×53mm and later in 7.92×57mm Mauser
 The Mauser Model 1903 rifle and short rifle and the Mauser Model 1905 carbine, both chambered in 7.65 and later in 7.92

 The Gewehr 98, received during and after World War I, in 7.92
 The Vz. 98/22 rifle, produced in Czechoslovakia, in 7.92
 The Mauser Model 1938, short rifle standardization of the Model 1893, Model 1903, Gewehr 88, Gewehr 98 and Vz. 98/22, in 7.92
 The Karabiner 98k in 7.92, bought after World War II

References

External links

See also 
 Belgian Mauser

Weapons of the Ottoman Empire
Rifles of Turkey
Mauser rifles